Ust-Vym (Jemdïn) is a rural locality (a selo) in Ust-Vymsky District of the Komi Republic, Russia, located by the mouth of the Vym River, from which it takes its name.

An ancient monastery established in 1380 by Stephen of Perm, closed in 1764, and reopened in 1996 is located in Ust-Vym.

References

Rural localities in the Komi Republic